Sansar Chand (c. 1765 – 1824) was a Rajput ruler of the erstwhile state of Kangra in what is now the Indian state of Himachal Pradesh.

Early life
Sansar Chand was a scion of the Katoch dynasty which had ruled Kangra for centuries until they were ousted by the Mughals in the early 17th century. In 1758, Sansar Chand's grandfather, Ghamand Chand, had been appointed then governor of Jalandhar by Ahmed Shah Abdali. Building upon this background, Sansar Chand rallied an army, ousted the Mughal governor of Kangra, Saif Ali Khan, and regained possession of his patrimony. Sansar Chand did a lot of work for the welfare of people mainly residing in nearby places apart from Kangra like Palampur, Hamirpur. He built many water distributaries, the water was used to feed animals and for cultivation.

Conflict with Sikhs and Gurkhas
During the campaign, Sansar Chand and his mercenary force overran other nearby principalities and compelled the submission of their rulers. He reigned over a relatively large part of present-day Himachal Pradesh for some two decades, but his ambitions brought him into conflict with the Gurkhas ruling the then nascent state of Nepal. The Gorkhas and the recently humbled hill-states allied to invade Kangra in 1806. Sansar Chand was defeated and left with no territory beyond the immediate vicinity of the fortress of Kangra. They managed to defeat Sansar Chand Katoch, the ruler of Kangra, in 1806 with the help of many provincial chiefs. However, Gorkhas could not capture Kangra fort which came under Maharaja Ranjit Singh in 1809. One of his forts is situated in the city of Nadaun.

Later years
Sansar Chand retired to the estates thus conferred upon him by Ranjit Singh and devoted his remaining years to cultural pursuits. He died in 1824, and was succeeded in his estates and titles by his son Anirudh Chand. The estate, which came under British suzerainty in 1846, was held by the progeny of Anirudh Chand until 1947, when it acceded unto the Dominion of India.

Personal life
Apart from his Son Anirudh Chand, Sansar Chand had two daughters by his wife, Prasanna Devi. Both of them were wed to the Raja Sudarshan Shah of Tehri Garhwal. Sansar Chand also had issue by his second wife, a commoner Rajput lady Gulab Dasi;also a son Raja Jodhbir Chand who established princely state of Nadaun. This is where Maharaja Sansar Chand spent his last days.

Legacy
He is remembered as a patron of the arts, and the Kangra paintings.

A museum to honour Maharaja Sansar Chand has been set up by the members of the Katoch Dynasty. The museum is located near the Kangra Fort and houses the private collection of the Royal Family of Kangra.

References

History of Himachal Pradesh
18th-century Indian monarchs
19th-century Indian monarchs
1765 births
1823 deaths
People from Kangra, Himachal Pradesh